Thomas Edward Bowdich (20 June 179110 January 1824) was an English traveller and author.

Life
Bowdich was born at Bristol and educated at Bristol Grammar School. In 1813, he married Sarah Wallis, who shared his subsequent career.
In 1814, through his uncle, John Hope Smith, governor of the British Gold Coast settlements, he obtained a writership in the service of the African Company of Merchants and was sent to Cape Coast.
In 1817, he was sent, with two companions, William Hutchison and Henry Tedlie, to Kumasi on a mission to Osei Bonsu, the King of Asante, and chiefly through his skillful diplomacy the mission succeeded in its object of securing British control over the coast natives.

In 1818, Bowdich returned to England, and in 1819 published an account of his mission and of the study he had made of the court of Kumasi, entitled Mission from Cape Coast Castle to Ashantee, &c. (London, 1819). He donated his Ashanti collection to the British Museum on his return, although the items would not receive the attention of the museum's trustees until after his death. His collection was an attempt to acquire items that depicted local crafts at the time. The collection remains the earliest documented one of Ashanti material, some of them the oldest surviving from that time, such as the oldest-known surviving adinkra cloth. 

Bowdich publicly attacked the management of the African committee who ran the African Company of Merchants. His strictures were instrumental in leading the British government to dissolve the African Company and assume direct control over the Gold Coast.

From 1820 to 1822, Bowdich lived in Paris, studying mathematics and the natural sciences, and was on intimate terms with Georges Cuvier, Alexander von Humboldt and other savants. During his stay in France he edited several works on Africa, and also wrote scientific works.
Angola and Mozambique (London, 1824).
In 1823, Bowdich and his wife, after some months spent in Madeira and Cape Verde Islands, arrived at Bathurst (now Banjul) at the mouth of the Gambia, intending to go to Sierra Leone and thence explore the interior. However, Bowdich died from malaria while in Bathurst on 10 January 1824, leaving his widow Sarah with three children.

His widow, Sarah (Wallis) Bowdich Lee, published an account of his last journey, entitled Excursions in Madeira and Porto Santo . . . to which is added A Narrative of the Continuance of the Voyage to its Completion, &c (London, 1825).
Bowdich's daughter, Mrs Tedlie Hutchison Hale, republished in 1873, with an introductory preface, her father's Mission from Cape Coast Castle to Ashantee.

Works

Notes

References

External links
 

English explorers
Explorers of Africa
People educated at Bristol Grammar School
Writers from Bristol
1791 births
1824 deaths
Deaths from malaria
19th-century English historians
African Company of Merchants